A urethrovaginal fistula is an abnormal passageway that may occur the urethra and the vagina. It is a sub-set of vaginal fistulas. It results in urinary incontinence as urine continually leaves the vagina. It can occur as an obstetrical complication, catheter insertion injury or a surgical injury.

It is also called a urethral fistula and may be referred to as UVF. They are quite rare. In the developed world, they are typically due to injuries due to medical activity.

References 

Noninflammatory disorders of female genital tract
Fistulas
Vaginal diseases
Human female reproductive system
Anatomy
Gynaecology